Mir Hasan is a village in Iran.

Mir Hasan may also refer to:

 Mir Hasan (poet), an 18th-century Urdu poet
 Mir Hasan Vazirov (1889–1918), an Azerbaijani socialist revolutionary

See also
 Mir Hasani, a village in southern Iran